Klaus-Friedrich Koch (1937-November 14, 1979) was a German-American legal anthropologist.

Early life
Koch began his university studies in Germany before coming to the University of California, Berkeley to finish his undergraduate degree and PhD.  While there, he studied under Laura Nader.

Career
Koch began teaching at Harvard University after graduating where he led a research project concerning conflict resolution in Fiji.

References

American anthropologists
German anthropologists
1937 births
1979 deaths
University of California, Berkeley alumni
Harvard University faculty